Temple Hill may refer to:

Places
Temple Hill, where the Oakland California Temple sits
Temple Hill (County of Warner No. 5), a hill in County of Warner No. 5, Alberta, Canada
Temple Hill (Hong Kong), a hill in Hong Kong
Temple Hill (Ireland), a 783 m hill in County Limerick, Republic of Ireland
Temple Hill, Kent, a suburb of Dartford in England
Temple Hill, Kentucky, a community in Barren County, southern Kentucky
Temple Hill Cemetery, a cemetery in Geneseo, New York
Temple Hill (Orange County, California), a named peak of the San Joaquin Hills
Temple Hill, a hill in Cardston, Alberta, Canada, on which the Cardston Alberta Temple was constructed
Temple Hill, a hill in Snowflake, Arizona, on which the Snowflake Arizona Temple was constructed
Temple Hill, a place in Jones County, Iowa
Temple Hill, a hill in Manti, Utah, on which the Manti Utah Temple was constructed
Temple Hill, a hill in Provo, Utah, on which Brigham Young University was constructed
Temple Hill, a nickname for the Oak Lawn estate in Washington, D.C.
Temple Hill Japanese Internment Camp, the World War II site is in the present day Temple Hill township of Zhifu (Chefoo), in Yantai, Shandong, China
Temple Hills, Maryland, an unincorporated area in Prince George's County, Maryland
Temple Mount, a religious site in Jerusalem
Tsz Wan Shan, a residential area of Hong Kong located at the base of Temple Hill, named after "Temple Hill" in Chinese

Other uses
"Temple Hill", an Irish dance song incorporated into "Molly on the Shore" by Percy Aldridge Grainger
Temple Hill (novel), a 2001 Forgotten Realms novel by Drew Karpyshyn
Temple Hill Entertainment, a film production company which produced The Twilight Saga films

See also
Weedon Lois
Weedon Bec